Mylios was an inland town of ancient Pisidia, inhabited during Hellenistic, Roman, and Byzantine times.

Its site is located near Asar, in Asiatic Turkey. Archaeologists have found the remains of a theatre there.

References

Populated places in Pisidia
Former populated places in Turkey
Roman towns and cities in Turkey
Populated places of the Byzantine Empire
History of Burdur Province
Ancient Greek archaeological sites in Turkey